200 mph is an auto racing action film directed by Cole McKay and distributed by The Asylum. It was released direct-to-DVD April 26, 2011. It is a mockbuster of the 2011 Universal Pictures film Fast Five.

Plot
When the older brother (Tommy Nash) he idolizes is run off the road by a ruthless drug dealer (Darren Thomas) during a nighttime street race known as Sepulveda Suicide, Rick Merchant (Jaz Martin) channels his grief into getting revenge behind the wheel. But to win, he'll need to modify his trusty 1988 Mazda RX-7/Nissan 240sx (Zenki/Kouki, chase scenes) -- with help from a mechanic Kelly (Hennely Jimenez) -- to get the maximum performance out of his machinery.

Cast
 Jaz Martin as Rick Merchant
 Hennely Jimenez as Kelly Garcia
 AnnaMaria DeMara as Claudia
 Darren Thomas as Kayce
 Zedrick Restauro as Phong
 Jared Kahn as Albert
 Paul Logan as Officer Flynn
 Janet Tracy Keijser as Debbie Merchant
 Tommy Nash as Tom Merchant
 Sam Aaron as Lou
 Cleo Berry as Jake
 Makelaie Brown as Domingo Juarez
 Pason as Amber
 Sean Cory Cooper as an Attendant
 Meredith Thomas as Cherrie the Manager
 Mike Gaglio as Doctor Steven
 Chris Trouble Delfosse as Trouble, Domingo's lead thug

Production
The title first appeared November 2010 on the official Asylum website as "200 MPH: Midnight Racers". More details on the film emerged when its official page on the website went live January 2010, around the same time principal photography began, revealing that the subtitle "Midnight Racers" had been dropped, and that the film will be directed by veteran stunts expert Cole McKay (Transformers: Dark of the Moon & Cloverfield) and written by Thunder Levin. Only Jaz Martin, Anna Maria DeMara, Darren Thomas, and Hennely Jimenez were announced for the cast. The film was slated for release on April 26, 2011.

During production, the Mazda RX-7 used as Rick Merchant's car was stolen. The RX-7 belonged to award-winning professional drifter Justin Pawlak. The vehicle was inside a 26-foot enclosed Aztex trailer, attached to Pawlak's Chevrolet 2500HD, altogether stolen in the middle of production.

Release
The film was released on DVD and Blu-ray on April 26, 2011. It was also made available for Video On Demand on cable and other websites including iTunes, Amazon, Zune (Also on Zune via Xbox Live), and Blockbuster.

Some foreign releases had given different titles to the film. In Greece it is released as 300 hlm, while in France the title is instead Fast Drive.

Reception
The film has received mixed reviews from critics.

H. Perry Horton of film-centric blog Committed gave the film a positive review, especially praising the performances of lead actors Jaz Martin and AnnaMaria DeMara. He also praises the film for having "a lot of heart for an action flick, more heart, in fact, than most of the F&F films, without sacrificing action."

Noel Anderson of Goof Roof also gave the film a positive review, praising the performances of actors Hennely Jimenez and Paul Logan, and states that "if you like furious displays of vehicular fury and strippers then this movie is a win win for you."

Christopher Armstead of Film Critics United describes the film as "tolerable" as far as films released by The Asylum. He cites bad acting from the cast, but singles out the performances of actors Darren Thomas, Paul Logan, and Tommy Nash as exceptions. Armstead states that the movie "wasn’t all that bad all things considered. The car racing scenes, minus the CGI cutaways, were far better than I expected them to be."

Trevor Anderson of Movie Mavericks gave the film a mixed review. The negative aspects cited include unnecessary cursing and nudity, and the CGI. The review however, was mostly positive praising director Cole McKay for good acting from the actors and well-framed shots. The actors are especially praised including Zedrick Restauro and Jared Kahn, having added "a much needed spark to the group dynamic, particularly in the scene where they steal a car from an impound lot." The actor described as the one that "shines the brightest" is Tommy Nash, even though only being in the movie for the first fifteen minutes.

One of the biggest complaints about the film is the inconsistency within the vehicles used, changing models throughout. At one point in the film, a car suddenly changes from an FC Chassis Mazda RX-7 to a Nissan 240sx (during fast scenes). The green 240sx also appears in a driving scene, when Rick visits the strip club, before it is first assembled in a later garage scene. The car is also referred to as an MX-5 during one garage scene, which is a Mazda Miata trim, and as a Mazda RX-7 in the next scene and throughout the rest of the film. The film also makes many general references to an estimated car capabilities, like the Nissan 370Z in the beginning of the movie and the Nissan Skyline GT-R that it races against. Most of the cars' estimates are not true to the information relating to real cars.

References

External links
 200 mph at The Asylum
 

2011 films
American action films
The Asylum films
Direct-to-video action films
Mockbuster films
2010s English-language films
American auto racing films
Films shot in Los Angeles
2011 action films
2011 independent films
2010s American films